Forever Baby is an EP recording by Juliana Hatfield released in 1992.

Track listing

Personnel
Juliana Hatfield - vocals, guitar, bass guitar
Todd Phillips - drums
Mike Leahy - guitar (tracks 1, 3)

Production
 Gary Smith –	producer (tracks 1, 2, 3)
 Jay Faires, Steve Balcom - executive producers
 Sean Slade - recorded tracks 4, 5

References

Juliana Hatfield albums
1992 EPs
Albums produced by Gary Smith (record producer)